Wolmyeongdong (a.k.a. Wol Myeong Dong) is a worship and recreation center in Chungnam Province, South Korea. It is also known as the headquarters of the Providence Church, also known as Christian Gospel Mission (CGM) and Jesus Morning Star (JMS). Wolmyeongdong consists of various facilities and buildings on a tract of land of about 991,735 square meters in size.

Development of Wolmyeongdong began in the early 1990s and was led by the Providence founder Jung Myung-seok, a messiah claimant. Wolmyeongdong is Jung Myung-seok's birthplace. Jung was found by Korean courts to have coerced and forced female followers to have sex with him "as a religious behavior meant to save their souls" in 2008 and convicted on four charges of rape. He was subsequently imprisoned for 10 years and released in 2018. In 2022, more women filed reports on alleged rape and sexual assault incidents at the JMS Wolmyeongdong headquarters.

As a recreation center, Wolmyeongdong contains various hiking and walking trails, a pond, an art gallery, a rock museum, a sports field, natural spring water, and various other amenities. However, since it is also a temple in nature that has been dedicated to the Holy Trinity, statues of the Holy Son can be seen around the sports field.

Rock Landscape
At the front mountain of Wolmyeongdong, there is a rock landscape called the Ambition Masterpiece. At the very end of the Ambition Masterpiece is a tall boulder that serves as a signboard for this natural temple. Engraved on it are the words Natural Temple in Korean. At the top of the Ambition Masterpiece, there are twin boulders with the inscription: "All this has been designed by God, inspired by the Holy Spirit, and protected by the Lord Jesus Christ. We have worked as Their hands and as their feet."

White Statue of the Holy Son 
Wolmyeongdong houses a monumental statue of Jesus that is entirely white. It depicts Jesus in a flowing robe with arms wide open, standing firmly upon a pedestal surrounded by a marble fence. The statue of Jesus stands in a prominent location within the retreat center next to the lawn sanctuary. Besides this white statue, there is also a bronze statue of Jesus and a stone statue.

Natural Spring Water 
Natural spring water flows in abundance from multiple areas in Wolmyeongdong in all seasons except Winter, when most of the springs are frozen.

History of Seasonal Events 
During each of the four seasons, CGM hosts various events throughout the year which include the summer retreats, spring flower festivals, and autumn rock festivals.

Spring Flower Festival

2014 Fragrant Flower Flower Aroma Festival 
From 2014 April 21 to May 20, CGM held a spring flower festival in Wolmyeongdong, called the Fragrant Flower Flower Aroma Festival. During the event, there were various art contests along the trail to the cultural center. The festival was based on this underlying theme: “In this place, everything is art."

2015 Flower Queen Festival 
From 2015 May 2 to May 10, CGM held another flower festival called the Flower Queen Festival in Wolmyeondong. Instead of contests, the festival's activities revolved around performances and videos. There was also an exhibition of proverbs written by Jeong Myeong Seok displayed in front of the Front Mountain. The proverbs explored the value of life and the value of receiving salvation.“Flowers are beautiful and fragrant. However, they wither away in an instant. In this way, life is like a flower, and the life of the physical body is a life of vanity.” - Proverb by Jeong Myeong Seok

2016 Myeong (Bright) Flower Festival 
From 2016 April 30 to May 8, CGM held their most recent flower festival called the Myeong Flower Festival in Wolmyeongdong. The flower festival was based on the idea that Christians are flowers with the fragrance of the Lord.“Our purpose for living is for our Creator. It is for Him that we live. Just as a flower must have its fragrance, as believers, let us become people who spread the Lord’s fragrance and love.” - Director of the Wolmyeongdong Recreation CenterThe 2016 Myeong Flower Festival differentiated itself from the previous flower festivals by including the local residents of Geumsan in the spring picnic held on May 4 and by having events on May 7 that the members of CGM could enjoy with their parents.

Autumn rock festivals 
After the initial success of the 2011 Rock Gem Festival, which had over 40,000 visitors, the Rock Gem Festival has become an annual event along with Wolmyeongdong's Flower Festivals, which also began in 2011.

2012 Gem Rock Festival 

On 2012 Oct 22, CGM held their second Rock Gem Festival. It was held with the purpose of getting people to think about the value of life while not only looking at the trails throughout Wolmyeongdong but also the rocks.

A person from the rock festival committee conveyed the purpose of the festival saying:“If you think of the time from the birth of the universe to the creation of the Earth, in a way, it takes 13 billion years for a rock to be made. So we try to think about how our lives have that much value and dignity, just like how God has been shaping nature until each rock has become its current figure.”

2013 Third Rock Treasure & Life Treasure Festival 
From 2013 Sep 28 to Oct 27, CGM held their third Rock Gem Festival. During the rock festival, CGM also held their National Soccer Tournament from October 10 to 12. Following the soccer tournament, there was a dance contest, “Move with the Sound of God,” on October 19. From then until October 27, there were other cultural events such as “The Music Concert Celebration of the Holy Son’s House of Love” and “The Dance Festival and Korean Traditional Music Festival with New Songs.”

In various places around Wolmyeongdong, from Heotgol to Nongol, 88 proverbs written by Jeong Myeong Seok were placed around so that people could remember the Creator and give glory to Him while enjoying God's creations and the rock gemstones littered throughout Wolmyeongdong.

Gusang Art Museum 
Throughout the year, various types of artwork are displayed in the Gusang Art Museum in Wolmyeongdong.

On February 21, CGM showcased paintings of palm trees and pine trees by Jeong Myeong Seok and other artists in the Gusang Art Museum in Wolmyeongdong.

One of the highlights of the Gusang Art Museum is the painting called Destiny, which symbolizes a person who has left his or her destiny up to God.A snail like the one in “Destiny” is the stork’s favorite prey. No one will say that the snail has any chance of survival, not even the stork: “You are my prey. You will be dead in one peak.” However, the snail did not surrender to death but said, “I will live.” It runs with all its might to avoid death, but no matter how fast the snail may run, before the stork, its speed is like that of an hour hand before the second hand.If you make a reservation at least one day before you go, you can view the exhibition while receiving a detailed explanation of the paintings from one of the museum's guides. Admission is free and the gallery is open from 10am to 5pm. However, it is closed every Wednesday.

Prayer assemblies 
CGM also holds prayer assemblies in Wolmyeongdong.

On 23 April 2014, CGM held a prayer meeting in Wolmyeongdong to pray for the victims of the Sewol Ferry incident and for all nations in the world to realize the value of life.

Other prayer assemblies in Wolmyeongdong have centered on praying for the future and peace of Korea. Since Jung emphasizes peace and harmony rather than on winning, the events in Wolmyeongdong engage people to interact harmoniously, whether it may be in sports competitions or struggles between nations.

Current status and management 
Currently, CGM is developing its third waterfall next to the Holy Son's House of Love. The area will be developed into a courtyard where people can swim in a 21 meter long swimming pool or enjoy the scenery of the lake and other areas while praising God.

Gallery

Hiking Trails

Panorama Views

References

External links

Website 
Wolmyeongdong Official English Site

Christianity in South Korea
Tourist attractions in South Chungcheong Province
Providence (religious movement)